Mangalam is a census town in Tiruppur district in the Indian state of Tamil Nadu.

Geography
It has an average elevation of 32 metres (104 feet).
It is located 1 kilometer toward the South from District headquarters Tirupur.
Mangalam is surrounded by Avanashi Taluk towards North Uttkkuli, Taluk towards East.

Neighborhoods
 Avinashi
 Tiruppur
 Vaazhaithottathu Ayyankoil 
 Samalapuram
 Somanur
 Karumathampatti
 Karuvampalayam
 Sultanpet
 Palladam
 Agrahaarapudhur
 Velayuthampalayam
 Andipalayam
 Karanampettai

Demographics
According to the 2001 Census of India, Mangalam, Tamil Nadu had a population of 7,892. Males constituted 51% of the population and females 49%. Mangalam had an average literacy rate of 67%, higher than the national average of 59.5%; male literacy was 76%, and female literacy was 59%. In Mangalam, 13% of the population was under 6 years of age. Mangalam was the first village to have 100% financial inclusion, where all households of this village were able to participate in banking.

References

Neighbourhoods and suburbs of Tiruppur